Khudania  is a village in Jhunjhunu district, Rajasthan, India. The village is famous for being resident of Shekhawat ,Nirban (one family), rajputs. Most of the residents of this village mostly work in Porbandar, Delhi, Mumbai, Jamnagar in Birla Group of companies.

References

Villages in Jhunjhunu district